The 2018 Wolffkran Open was a professional tennis tournament played on carpet courts. It was the second edition of the tournament which was part of the 2018 ATP Challenger Tour. It took place in Ismaning, Germany between 15 and 21 October 2018.

Singles main draw entrants

Seeds

 1 Rankings are as of 8 October 2018.

Other entrants
The following players received wildcards into the singles main draw:
  Jeremy Jahn
  Kai Lemstra
  Christian Seraphim
  Louis Wessels

The following players received entry into the singles main draw as special exempts:
  Grégoire Barrère
  Ugo Humbert

The following players received entry from the qualifying draw:
  Alexander Erler
  Johannes Härteis
  Lukáš Klein
  Tristan Lamasine

Champions

Singles

 Filippo Baldi def.  Gleb Sakharov 6–4, 6–4.

Doubles

 Purav Raja /  Antonio Šančić def.  Rameez Junaid /  David Pel 5–7, 6–4, [10–5].

External links
 Official website

Wolffkran Open
2018
Wolf